Country Meadows, Illinois may refer to:
Country Meadows, Adams County, Illinois, an unincorporated community in Adams County, Illinois
Country Meadows, Will County, Illinois, an unincorporated community in Will County, Illinois